Toilet seat risers, toilet risers, or raised toilet seats are assistive technology devices to improve the accessibility of toilets to older people or those with disabilities.

They can aid in transfer from wheelchairs, and may help prevent falls. Inappropriately high risers may actually increase fall risk.

Some people may find plastic risers to be unattractive or carry a stigma. They may also interfere with the toilet habits of other users.

See also
Grab bar
Accessibility of toilets
Home modifications
Occupational Therapy
Assistive Technology

References 

Toilets
Assistive technology